No Filter is a 2016 Chilean comedy film directed by Nicolás López.

Plot 
Pía (Paz Bascuñán) is a 37-year-old modern woman living in bustling Santiago in 2015. Every day, her boss, boyfriend, stepson, and best friend treat her as if she's irrelevant, and she feels powerless to change it. Pía suffers from persistent chest pain that makes it difficult for her to function, and one day, after experiencing intense pain, she decides to undergo an ancient Oriental acupuncture treatment offered by a mysterious Chinese doctor.

Unintentionally, the treatment releases everything Pía has been holding inside and takes her on a journey of personal liberation. Finally, Pía is able to tell people what she truly thinks of them, without any filter, and this helps ease her pain. Over time, however, Pía learns that speaking her mind may not always have positive consequences and can even hurt the people she loves. She must learn to control this new version of herself to move forward with her life.

Cast 
 Paz Bascuñán - Pía Vargas
 Antonio Quercia - Antonio
  - Gabriel
  - Javiera
 Ignacia Allamand - Maca
 Ariel Levy - Bastián
  - Emilia Dimitri
  - Tere
  - Yi-Ho
 Antonia Zegers - car woman.
 Francisco Ortega - psychiatrist.

Remakes 
The movie led to a series of remakes, including: Una mujer sin filtro (Mexico), Empowered (Spain), Super Crazy (Argentina), Sin Pepitas en la Lengua (Panama), and Recontraloca (Peru).

References

External links 

2016 comedy films
Chilean comedy films
2010s Chilean films
2010s Spanish-language films